Portrait of a Young Man is a 32×26 cm oil on panel portrait painting by Giovanni Bellini, dating to c.1490–1495 and now in the Louvre in Paris, to whom it was given by comte Albert de Vandeul in 1902.

References

Young Man, Paris
Young Man, Paris
Paintings in the Louvre by Italian artists
Young Man